Thordis Elva Thorvaldsdottir is an Icelandic author, speaker, playwright and activist for gender equality. In 2017, she gained world-wide recognition for writing the book South of Forgiveness. She was voted Woman of the Year 2015 by the Federation of Icelandic Women's Societies in Reykjavík. She specialises in violence prevention and digital rights, and has helped shape national policy on online abuse as well as gender-based violence.

In 2017, Thordis Elva became one of the frontrunners of the #MeToo movement in Iceland, accepting the Person of the Year Award 2017 on behalf of the movement. She currently lives in Reykjavik, Iceland.

Literary works 
Thordis' most well known book is South of Forgiveness, a documentation of her sexual assault and journey to healing and freedom, in which Thordis collaborated with her perpetrator, making her the first rape survivor in the world to publicly do so. In 1996, Tom Stranger, aged 18, was offered a student exchange trip to Iceland where he met 16-year-old Thordis Elva at a theatrical event organized by the school they both attended. They began a romantic relationship in Reykjavík, and had been in a relationship for over a month prior to the sexual assault taking place. Stranger took Thordis Elva home on the night of a school Christmas dance where she had become intoxicated by alcohol. She was raped by Stranger in her home. Tom ended their relationship two days after the rape and returned to Australia when his exchange program was completed. Thordis Elva didn't press charges, explaining that she was "a 16-year-old kid with a head full of misconceptions ... I didn’t put two and two together and realise what I had been through was actually rape," on the Australian talk show Q&A in 2017.

Nine years later at the age of 25, Thordis Elva, suffering from emotional trauma from the event, contacted Stranger by email and he responded. After 8 years of communicating via email, they arranged to meet in Cape Town, South Africa for a period of one week to  "face their past, once and for all", discussing the impact of Tom's violent actions on both of their lives, for him to take full responsibility for it and for both of them to heal. In the months after returning home, they co-authored the book South of Forgiveness. Their aim was to contribute their story to the global dialogue about sexual violence, perpetrator responsibility and the importance of consent.

Thordis also wrote the book, 'The Plain Truth' (Á mannamáli) about gender-based violence in Iceland and its status within the criminal justice system, the public discourse and the political landscape. The Plain Truth was one of the most critically acclaimed books published in Iceland in 2009, receiving a nomination to the Icelandic Literature Prize, amongst other awards.

As a playwright, nine of Thordis Elva's plays have been professionally staged in some of Iceland's most prominent theatres. She was nominated to the Icelandic Theatre Prize as Playwright of the Year 2006, for her play 'Hunger'. She has also represented Iceland in conferences for the world's best young playwrights (World Interplay, 2005 and Interplay Europe 2008).

Expert consultation work 
Thordis has taken part in shaping national policy on gender-based violence, and was appointed by the Minister of Social Affairs to the committee that crafted Iceland's latest action plan to counter violence against women and children. She also contributed to the policy regarding abuse and ill treatment of children in Reykjavík municipality in 2015. After years of violence prevention work in the offline realm, she organised an awareness-raising campaign about image-based sexual abuse online (where intimate photos are shared without the photographed individual's consent, also known as revenge porn) and educated 18,000 people in a series of workshops across three countries in 2015 alone. She has spoken about the role of digital media in furthering gender equality at the UN and the Nordic Council of ministers and has contributed to anthologies about image-based sexual abuse online. In 2019, she was commissioned by Slovenian authorities to write recommendations as well as educate the country's policy makers and media professionals on violence against women and girls online. She was the keynote speaker at two of Europe's largest conferences on internet safety in 2019, the Safer Internet Forum and the Click Off Cyber Violence conference.

Public speaking 
As an advocate for gender equality, Thordis Elva has spoken publicly for decades, serving as keynote speaker and expert panelist in various conferences and events in venues such as the UN Headquarters, the Sydney Opera House and the European Parliament. She has also toured with her co-author Tom Stranger and spoken publicly about their experiences, appearing on TED talks, BBC Newsnight and at London's Royal Festival Hall at the Southbank Centre.

Short films 
Thordis Elva was commissioned by the Icelandic government to reshape the approach to violence prevention and sex education in elementary schools, resulting in the short-films 'Get Consent' and 'Stand By Yourself', both of which were aired on national television and are still used in schools across Iceland with unprecedented results, according to a nationwide opinion poll. 'Get Consent' won first prize at the INSAFE conference in 2013 and has been screened in the UN and European Commission. 'Stand By Yourself' was also critically acclaimed, reaping a nomination the 2015 Edda Awards. In 2018, the short film 'Take My Picture' was released online, after receiving one of the largest grants from the Icelandic Equality Fund. All three films share the common themes of self-respect, bodily integrity and the importance of consent in all intimate exchanges, both online and offline.

Army of light 
Thordis has created a large Instagram following, which she refers to as 'The Army of Light,' a term she coined during her high-risk pregnancy with her twins, Swan and Acer (born on May 8, 2018). She suffered PPROM in week 17 of her pregnancy, resulting in the rupturing of one of the twins' amniotic sacs. Doctors gave her a grim prognosis and a less than 1% chance of the twins' survival. She resisted doctor's recommendations to abort the pregnancy and remained confined to her bed for the following three months. She frequently refers to this as a very "dark period" of her life, but the support she received from strangers broke the isolation of her bedrest and lit up her days (hence the Army of Light reference). Born in week 28, the twins are healthy despite their prematurity and Swan, whose amniotic sac ruptured, has none of the respiratory problems that medical experts had predicted. Thordis Elva has paid tribute to her Army of Light in various interviews, saying that their support and light helped her stay strong when all hope seemed lost. She now uses this platform to spread awareness of others around the world who are going through a difficult time, encouraging solidarity and kindness. In January 2020, Thordis Elva announced to her Instagram followers that she was considering writing a book about the twins' survival and the role social media played in it.

See also
A Better Man (film), a film on intimate partner violence and responsibility
 Acquaintance rape
 Against Our Will, a book about rape of women by men
 Date rape
 Effects and aftermath of rape

References

External links
 Authors web page on other projects
 Author's web page about the book

Icelandic dramatists and playwrights
Icelandic feminists
Living people
Year of birth missing (living people)
Icelandic memoirists
Women dramatists and playwrights
Women memoirists
21st-century Icelandic women writers
21st-century Icelandic writers
21st-century dramatists and playwrights
21st-century non-fiction writers
21st-century memoirists